The 46th Expeditionary Reconnaissance Squadron is an active Central Command unit of the United States Air Force.

The squadron was first activated as the 719th Bombardment Squadron in May 1943.   After training in the United States, the squadron deployed to the Mediterranean Theater of Operations, where it participated in the strategic bombing campaign against Germany.  The squadron was awarded two Distinguished Unit Citations for its actions during the war. Following V-E Day, the 716th returned to the United States and was inactivated in June 1945.

The squadron was activated again in September and trained with Boeing B-29 Superfortresses.  It was redesignated the 46th Reconnaissance Squadron two months later, becoming one of the first long range reconnaissance units in Strategic Air Command (SAC).  In August 1946, the squadron deployed to Ladd Field, Alaska Territory, where it conducted long range aerial reconnaissance over the Arctic.  The 46th squadron flew "Project Nanook" to assess the Soviet threat in the Arctic at the beginning of the Cold War. The unit developed the grid system of Navigation which made Arctic navigation routine. The squadron's F-13, serial 45-21848 was the first aircraft to fly over the North Pole on 16 October 1946.  It was inactivated on 13 October 1947 and transferred its assets to the 72d Reconnaissance Squadron.

The squadron was converted to provisional status and reformed in 2004 and deployed to Iraq and, later, to Afghanistan.

History

World War II
The squadron was first activated in May 1943 at Davis-Monthan Field, Arizona as the 719th Bombardment Squadron, one of the four original squadrons of the 449th Bombardment Group.  It trained with Consolidated B-24 Liberators at Alamogordo Army Air Field, New Mexico and Bruning Army Air Field, Nebraska before departing for the Mediterranean Theater of Operations in November 1943.

The squadron assembled at its combat station, Grottaglie Airfield in Southern Italy, in early January 1944, from which it operated primarily on strategic bombing missions.  It attacked oil refineries, communications centers, aircraft factories and industrial facilities in Italy, Germany, Czechoslovakia, Hungary, Romania, Albania and Greece.  The squadron was awarded a Distinguished Unit Citation (DUC) for its actions on 4 April 1944, when the squadron, along with the other elements of the 449th Group, operated without fighter escort in an attack on railroad marshalling yards near Bucharest.   The attacking group was heavily outnumbered by German interceptor aircraft, but not only succeeded in destroying its assigned target, but inflicted heavy losses on the defending fighters.  It was awarded a second DUC for an attack against oil refineries near Ploesti, attacking through heavy smoke that obscured the target area and despite intense enemy fire.

The squadron attacked gun emplacements to support Operation Dragoon, the invasion of southern France in August 1944.  It attacked troop concentrations, bridges and viaducts during Operation Grapeshot, the Fifteenth Army Group offensive in Northern Italy in the Spring of 1945.  Shortly after V-E Day, in May 1945, the squadron returned to the United States.
 
The squadron reformed at Sioux Falls Army Air Field, South Dakota at the end of May.  The 449th Group began training with Boeing B-29 Superfortress very heavy bombers.   However, very heavy bomber groups were authorized three squadrons, rather than the four squadrons of heavy bomber groups, and the squadron was inactivated In June 1945.

Arctic reconnaissance

The squadron was reactivated in September 1945 Grand Island Army Air Field, and began training on the B-29.  It was redesignated the 46th Reconnaissance Squadron in June 1946.  Its new mission was to provide very long range reconnaissance as part of the newly established Strategic Air Command (SAC). The 46th Reconnaissance Squadron was SAC's first operational unit. The squadron was equipped with eighteen reconnaissance-modified Superfortresses.  Eight of the aircraft were modified into the F-13A reconnaissance configuration, being fitted with special camera installations for photographic mapping and aerial reconnaissance work. The F-13As carried three K-17B, two K-22 and one K-18 cameras with provisions for others.  However, the standard B-29 bombing equipment and defensive armament were retained.

Simultaneously with its redesignation, the squadron moved to Ladd Field, Alaska with a mission to fly reconnaissance and photographic mapping missions over the Arctic and perform reconnaissance along the northern border of Soviet territory in the Arctic, as well as deep-penetration reconnaissance flights.  All of its missions were classified as Top Secret, the classification wasn't dropped until 2001.  In August, the squadron was transferred from SAC to Alaskan Air Command.

The squadron flew its first operational mission on 2 August 1946 from its base at Ladd, eventually flying more than 5,000 hours in the Arctic and over 1,000,000 miles in its first year of operations, testing material and the limits of flying personnel in the Arctic.   It made the first aircraft flight over the Geographic North Pole on 16 October 1946, eventually accomplishing over 100 flights to the pole and its immediate vicinity.    It performed photo mapping of 5,500,000 square miles of the Arctic, including areas for the strategic location of defense components, and future locations of radar sites along the northern Canadian region.  Exploratory flights were made to obtain information necessary to establish commercial airline service over the Arctic.

When the squadron arrived in Alaska, large areas of the territory and northern Canada were largely unexplored.   The squadron developed means of polar navigation necessary due to the unreliability of magnetic compasses, and many existing maps of the region were unreliable.  The grid system of navigation was developed which enabled navigators to navigate to locations within one mile of accuracy.

The squadron was inactivated on 13 October 1947.  Its mission, personnel and equipment were transferred to the 72d Reconnaissance Squadron, which was simultaneously activated. The 72d continued the arctic reconnaissance mission until moving to the United States in June 1949.  The two units are sometimes referred to as the 46th/72d Reconnaissance Squadron and a former alumni group was titled the 46th/72d Recon Association.

Expeditionary operations

The squadron was converted to provisional status as the 46th Expeditionary Reconnaissance Squadron and was assigned to the 332d Expeditionary Operations Group.  It deployed to Tallil Air Base, Iraq with the General Atomics MQ-1 Predator as part of Operation Iraqi Freedom under the command of the 332d Air Expeditionary Wing. Sometime between then and June 2004 the unit moved to Joint Base Balad. Sometime between June 2004 and 2009 the unit was renamed to "46th Expeditionary Reconnaissance and Attack Squadron". During May 2016 the unit was noticed operating from Ali Al Salem Airbase, Kuwait, against Da'esh as part of the Military intervention against ISIL operating over Iraq and Syria under the 386th Air Expeditionary Wing.

The squadron replaced its Predators with General Atomics MQ-9 Reapers, becoming the 46th Expeditionary Attack Squadron.  It carried out its first mission with the Block 5 Reaper in support of Operation Inherent Resolve on 20 October 2017.  Squadron members prepare its UAVs for missions and control their takeoff and landing, During flight, they are handed off to pilots and sensor operators in the United States for control through satellite systems.  Local control by the 46th is required during takeoff and landing due to the short delay inherent in the satellite based communications links used by controllers at Creech Air Force Base, Nevada.

Lineage
 Constituted as the  719th Bombardment Squadron (Heavy) on 6 April 1943
 Activated on 1 May 1943
 Redesignated 719th Bombardment Squadron, Very Heavy on 7 September 1945
 Inactivated on 11 June 1945
 Redesignated 719th Bombardment Squadron, Very Heavy on 7 September 1945
 Activated on 17 September 1945
 Redesignated 46th Reconnaissance Squadron (Very Long Range, Photographic) on 1 June 1946
 Inactivated on 13 October 1947
 Converted to provisional status and redesignated: 46th Expeditionary Reconnaissance Squadron c. 2003
 Activated c. 10 September 2003
 Inactivated c. 2011
 Redesignated '''46th Expeditionary Attack Squadron
 Activated c. 2013

Assignments
 449th Bombardment Group, 1 May 1943 – 11 June 1945
 449th Bombardment Group,  17 September 1945
 Fifteenth Air Force (SAC), 4 August 1946
 Alaskan Air Command, 19 August 1946
 Yukon Sector, Alaskan Air Command, 1 October 1946 – 13 October 1947
 332d Expeditionary Operations Group, 10 September 2003 – c. 2011
 386th Air Expeditionary Wing, unknown - present

Stations
 Davis-Monthan Field, Arizona, 1 May 1943
 Alamogordo Army Air Field, New Mexico, 5 July 1943
 Bruning Army Air Field, Nebraska, 12 September–26 November 1943
 Grottaglie Airfield, Italy, 3 January 1944 – 15 May 1945
 Sioux Falls Army Air Field, South Dakota, 29 May-11 June 1945
 Grand Island Army Air Field, Nebraska, 17 September 1945
 Ladd Field, Alaska, 1 June 1946 – 13 October 1947
 Ali Air Base, Iraq, c. 10 September 2003
 Balad Air Base, Iraq, June 2004 - c. 2011
 Ali Al Salem Air Base, Kuwait, c. 2013 – present

Aircraft
 Consolidated B-24 Liberator, 1943–1945
 Boeing B-17 Flying Fortress, 1945
 Boeing B-29 Superfortress, 1945–1947
 Boeing F-13A Superfortess, 1945–1947
 General Atomics MQ-1 Predator, 2004–present
 General Atomics MQ-9 Reaper, unknown-present

Awards and campaigns

See also

 Kee Bird

References

Citations
 Explanatory notes

 Citations

Bibliography
 
 
 
 

046